Ludwig Michael Schwanthaler, later ennobled as Ritter von Schwanthaler (26 August 1802 – 14 November 1848), was a German sculptor who taught at the Academy of Fine Arts, Munich.

Biography
Schwanthaler was born in Munich.

His family had been sculptors in Tyrol and Innviertel for three centuries; young Ludwig received his earliest lessons from his father, Franz Schwanthaler (1762–1820), and the father had been instructed by the grandfather. The last to bear the name was Xaver, who worked in his cousin Ludwig's studio and survived till 1854. For successive generations the family lived by the carving of busts and sepulchral monuments, and from the condition of craftsmen rose to that of artists.

From the Munich Gymnasium Schwanthaler passed as a student to the Munich Academy; at first he purposed to be a painter, but afterwards reverted to the sculptural arts of his ancestors. His talents received timely encouragement by a commission for an elaborate silver service for the king's table. Peter von Cornelius also befriended him; the great painter was occupied on designs for the decoration in fresco of the newly erected Glyptothek, and at his suggestion Schwanthaler was employed on the sculpture within the halls.

Thus arose between painting, sculpture, and architecture that union and mutual support which characterized the revival of the arts in Bavaria. Schwanthaler in 1826 went as a pensioner of the king to Rome, where he carried out a number of commissions, and on a second visit in 1832 Bertel Thorvaldsen gave him kindly help. His skill was so developed that on his return he was able to meet the extraordinary demand for sculpture occasioned by King Ludwig's passion for building new palaces, churches, galleries, and museums, and he became the fellow-worker of the architects Leo von Klenze, Friedrich von Gartner and Joseph Daniel Ohlmüller, and of the painters Cornelius, Julius Schnorr von Karolsfeld and Karl Hess.

Owing to the magnitude and multitude of the sculptural commissions they turned out, over-pressure and haste in design and workmanship brought down the quality of the art. The works of Schwanthaler in Munich are so many and miscellaneous that they can only be briefly indicated. The Neues Palais is peopled with his statues: the throne-room has twelve imposing gilt bronze figures 10 feet high; the same palace is also enriched with a frieze and with sundry other decorations modelled and painted from his drawings. The sculptor, like his contemporary painters, received help from trained pupils, one of whom, Anton Dominik Fernkorn, went on to have a very successful career in Vienna. The same prolific artist also furnished Munich's Alte Pinakothek with twenty-five marbles commemorating great painters; likewise he supplied a composition for the pediment of the exhibition building facing the Glyptothek, and executed sundry figures for the public library and the hall of the marshals.

Sacred art lay outside his ordinary routine, yet in the churches of St Ludwig and St Mariahilf he gave proof of the widest versatility. The Ruhmeshalle afforded further gauge of unexampled power of production; here alone is work which, if adequately studied, might have occupied a lifetime; ninety-two metopes, and, conspicuously, the colossal but feeble figure of Bavaria, 60 ft. high, rank among the boldest experiments. A short life of forty-six years did not permit serious undertakings beyond the Bavarian capital, yet time was found for the groups within the north pediment of the Walhalla, Regensburg, and also for numerous portrait statues, including those of Mozart, Jean Paul, Goethe and Shakespeare.

Schwanthaler died in Munich in 1848, and willed to the Munich Academy all his models and studies, which formed the Schwanthaler Museum. He is buried in the Alter Südfriedhof in Munich.

Selected works

References

External links 
 

1802 births
1848 deaths
Artists from Munich
19th-century German people
19th-century Austrian people
19th-century sculptors
German sculptors
German male sculptors
Austrian sculptors
Austrian male sculptors
Austrian knights
German people of Austrian descent
German expatriates in Austria
Burials at the Alter Südfriedhof
Recipients of the Pour le Mérite (civil class)